Flora Payne Whitney, also known as Flora Whitney Miller (July 27, 1897 – July 18, 1986), was an American artist and socialite, art collector, and patron of the arts.

Early life
Flora Payne Whitney was born on July 27, 1897 and raised in Manhattan.  Her father was Harry Payne Whitney (1872–1930), a sportsman and heir to the Whitney family fortune, and her mother was Gertrude Vanderbilt (1875–1942), heiress to a substantial part of the Vanderbilt family fortune. She attended Brearley School in New York and Foxcroft School in Middleburg, Virginia, where she met and became close lifelong friends with the artist Kay Sage.

Career
During World War I, she worked with Ruth Hanna McCormick, wife of Senator Joseph M. McCormick, at the Washington headquarters of the Republican Women's National Executive Committee.

Whitney worked closely with her mother, Gertrude Vanderbilt Whitney in the founding and endowing of the Whitney Museum of Art in New York. After her mother's death, Whitney served as President of the Museum from 1941 until 1966, and as chairman from 1966 through 1974. Whitney's daughter and granddaughter remain active in museum affairs to this day.

Personal life
On August 4, 1916, Whitney made her debut at "The Reefs," the Payne-Whitney "cottage" in Newport, Rhode Island.  She was escorted by Quentin Roosevelt, son of President Theodore Roosevelt, although her father did not approve of young Roosevelt. After the United States entered World War I, Quentin enlisted in the U.S. Army Air Service, and became engaged to Whitney before leaving for duty overseas. The glamorous young couple never married, since Quentin was killed in aerial combat  in July, 1918.  Love letters exchanged between Flora and Quentin while he was at the front were featured in Edward Renehan's book about TR's sons, The Lion's Pride: Theodore Roosevelt and His Family in Peace and War.

In 1920, Whitney married Roderick Tower at St. Bartholomew's Church, New York.  He was an aviator who had trained with Quentin Roosevelt at Mineola air field on Long Island. Tower was also a stockbroker, and son of U.S. Ambassador to Russia and Germany Charlemagne Tower Jr.  The marriage was a failure, however, due to Tower's drinking and infidelity. Before their divorce in August 1925, they had two children together: 
Pamela Tower (1921-2013), who married Jay Ketchum Secor (1912–1960) in 1941. They divorced in 1950 and she later married Thomas LeBoutillier (1913–1979)
Whitney Tower (1923–1999)

In 1927, Whitney married George Macculloch Miller III (d. 1972) in Cairo, Egypt.  Miller was an artist and member of the architectural firm of Noel & Miller, from 1930 to 1948, and a grandson of George Macculloch Miller (1832–1917), the founder of what would become the United Hospital Fund. The marriage to "Cully" Miller was long and happy, and Whitney had two more children:
Flora Miller (b. 1928), who married Michael Henry Irving She later married Sydney Francis Biddle (1918–2004)
Leverett Saltonstall Miller (b. 1931)

She died on July 18, 1986 at Community Hospital in Glen Cove, New York.

Descendants
Whitney's grandson John LeBoutillier is a political columnist and commentator and a one-term U.S. Representative representing a Long Island district. Her great-grandson, Josiah Hornblower (son of Whitney Tower's daughter, Alexandra Tower Hornblower Thorne) was featured in the documentary Born Rich.

Family tree

References

Sources

 "Society Welcomes Miss Flora Whitney", The New York Times, August 5, 1916.
 "Flora Whitney Wed to Roderick Tower", The New York Times, April 20, 1920.

20th-century American philanthropists
1897 births
1986 deaths
American debutantes
American people of Dutch descent
American people of English descent
American people of Welsh descent
Brearley School alumni
New York (state) Republicans
Philanthropists from New York (state)
Flora Payne
Flora Payne